Grassy Knoll is the fifth studio album by the New Zealand band The Exponents, released in September 1994. The album reached number 9 in the New Zealand Album charts and went gold. In May 2013, Universal Music re-released the album digitally in New Zealand in remastered standard and deluxe editions. The deluxe edition has six additional tracks of a single B-side and live recordings.

Track listing
"Happy Loving People"
"Like She Said"
"Fate"
"Losing You"
"Don't Say Goodbye"
"House Of Love"
"Day By Day"
"Couple Of Things"
"Helen"
"It Didn't And It Does"
"Baby I'll See you Later" (hidden track)

Additional tracks on 2013 digital deluxe edition:
"So This Is Love"
"I'll Say Goodbye (Even Though I'm Blue)" (live)
"Whatever Happened To Tracey" (live)
"Sometimes" (live)
"Erotic" (live)
"Why Does Love Do This To Me" (live)

All songs written by Jordan Luckexcept "Day By Day" by Gent/Luck, "So This Is Love" by Phil Judd and "Whatever Happened To Tracey" by Sheehan/Luck

Band members
 Jordan Luck (vocals)
 David Gent (bass guitar)
 Harry (drums)

Additional musicians
 Dave Dobbyn (guitars/vocals)
 Brent Williams (guitars)
 Trish Young (duet vocals on "Don't Say Goodbye")
 Ken Stewart (backing vocals on "Don't Say Goodbye")
 Paul Skates (guitar/backing vocals on "House Of Love")

Credits
 Produced, mixed and recorded by David Hemming
 Assistant engineer Jason Blackwell
 Assistant mix engineer Spiro Fousketakis
 Recorded at Megaphon Studios, Sydney, Australia
 Mixed at Gotham Audio, Melbourne, Australia
 Mastered at 301 Studios Sydney, Australia
 Cover art: Dan Sheehan

Charts

References 

1994 albums
The Exponents albums